Statistics of Swiss Super League in the 1922–23 season.

No championship title awarded
The team Young Boys sportingly ended the season as Central group winners. But before the start of the championship play-offs, the qualification match FC Biel-Bienne versus FC Bern (the game ended 3–1) from 25.02.1923 was awarded 0–3 due to ineligible players of FC Biel-Bienne. So both Young Boys Bern and FC Bern were level with 22 points and consequently a play-off was to be held for the regional championship. Young Boys withdrew from this match. Thus FC Bern continued to the finals, which they won. After the play-offs finals had been completed, the qualification match Basel versus FC Bern (the game ended 0–4) from 04.02.1923 was awarded 3–0 forfait because FC Bern had played an ineligible player. After this decision Young Boys were again winners of the regional group. The date of this decision was in September 1923 and there was not enough time left for a new Play-off Final before the next season started. Therefore, no Swiss championship title was awarded for 1922/23 season.

East

Table

Results

Central

Table

Results

West

Table

Results

Final

Table

Results 

|colspan="3" style="background-color:#D0D0D0" align=center|6 May 1923

|-
|colspan="3" style="background-color:#D0D0D0" align=center|13 May 1923

|-
|colspan="3" style="background-color:#D0D0D0" align=center|27 May 1923

References

Sources 
 Switzerland 1922-23 at RSSSF

Seasons in Swiss football
Swiss Football League seasons
1922–23 in Swiss football
Swiss